Playero 38 is DJ Playero's 2nd album, recorded sometime between 1993. With the success of Playero 37: Underground, The Noise: Underground, The Noise Vol. 1 and The Noise Vol. 2 giving reggaeton great momentum, DJ Playero released Playero 38: Underground. It established the dembow as the official rhythm of reggaeton, while lifting the genre to mainstream status. However, as with Playero 37, many of the lyrics focus on promoting the use of marijuana, and this added to the negative perception the genre gained in its early stages. Consequently, the government of Puerto Rico confiscated thousands of reggaeton records, because of the lack of disclosure about their explicit content.

The album features many of the veterans from Playero 37, including Daddy Yankee, Blanco, Yaviah, OG Black, Master Joe, Frankie Boy, Maicol & Manuel, Ranking Stone, among others. It also introduces many future successful Reggaeton artists in Rey Pirin, Ruben Sam, Miguel Play, Kalil, Original Q, Grupo Nizze, Camalion and K.I.D.

Track listing
Side A: Non-Stop Reggae

 Intro 1 - Daddy Yankee By D Nice NYC  
 Blanco
 Ruben Sam
 Grupo Nizze
 Alma
 Rey Pirin
 Camaleon
 O.G. Black
 Q Mack Daddy & Nico Canada
 Charlie & Dandy
 Miguel Play
 K.I.D.

Side B: Raagga Mix to Mix
 Intro 2 - Maicol & Manuel
 K.I.D.
 Master Joe
 DJ Playero
 Frankie Boy
 Shalimar
 Ranking Stone
 Original Q
 2 Sweet
 Psycho Unity

Bonus Track
 Intro 3 - O.G. Black
 Q Mack Daddy
 Grupo Nizze
 Frankie Boy
 Camaleon
 Ranking Stone
 HCP & MC Tres
 Gumy Man
 B.F. Yaviah
 Kalil
 Mayordomo

References

DJ Playero albums
1994 albums